Ruby Veridiano is a Filipina-American writer, co-founder of Spoken word collective iLL-Literacy, and a former VJ for Myx TV. She is also a social change advocate, with an emphasis on girls empowerment.

In 2008, she hosted Myxology for Myx TV.

Biography
Ruby grew up in Sacramento, California. During her first year attending UC Davis, she met Adriel Luis and co-founded a Spoken word collective, iLL-Literacy, of which she was the only female member in 2001. She worked for Jive Records in New York City during the summer of 2007, which she believes had helped her in terms of envisioning how she wants to craft her own independent artistic career. She later returned to Oakland, California. In the summer of 2008, Ruby became a VJ for Myx TV. In a previous interview, she defined her writing and performance style as raw and honest and her inspiration comes from "the most spontaneous, unexpected places."

Publications
 Miss Universe (2008)

References

External links
 Myx Profile
 Venus Zine feature

VJs (media personalities)
Filipino emigrants to the United States
American writers of Filipino descent
University of California, Davis alumni
Living people
1983 births